Augusto Cachitiopolo, known by the royal title of Ekuikui IV, (c. 1913 – January 14, 2012) was an Angolan royal and politician, who served as the King of Bailundo in Huambo Province. Politically, Cachitiopolo served as a member of the National Assembly of Angola and a member of the MPLA's central committee.

King Ekuikui IV died from an illness on January 14, 2012, at the age of 98.

References

Year of birth uncertain
1910s births
2012 deaths
Angolan royalty
MPLA politicians
Members of the National Assembly (Angola)
People from Huambo Province